Çobanhasan station is a station in the village of Çobanhasan, Turkey. The station consists of a single platform serving one track. TCDD Taşımacılık operates two daily trains that stop at the station: the 6th of September Express and the 17th of September Express.

The station was opened in 1890, by the Smyrna Cassaba Railway.

References

External links
Station timetable

Railway stations in Manisa Province
Railway stations opened in 1890
1890 establishments in the Ottoman Empire
Akhisar District